North Benton is an unincorporated community in Alberta Township, Benton County, Minnesota, United States, located nine miles north of Foley at the intersection of Benton County Roads 3 and 12.

References

Unincorporated communities in Benton County, Minnesota
Unincorporated communities in Minnesota